Garciez is a small rural town in the Spanish province of Andalusia, surrounded completely by farming, near the Pantano Grande. Population 497.

Geography of Andalusia